The PSM College of Dental Science and Research is a dental college situated in Akkikavu, Thrissur in Kerala, South India. The college is affiliated to the Kerala University of Health Sciences and approved by the Dental Council of India.

References

Medical colleges in Thrissur
Dental colleges in India
Colleges affiliated with the Kerala University of Health Sciences